Karuna Shukla (1 August 1950 – 27 April 2021) was a member of the 14th Lok Sabha of India.

Biography
She represented the Janjgir constituency of Chhattisgarh and was a member of the Bharatiya Janata Party (BJP) political party till 2013. She lost the 2009 elections from Korba to Charan Das Mahant of the Indian National Congress who was minister at union govt.

She resigned from the BJP on 25 October 2013 citing that the party was "allegedly under the grip of power politics".

Karuna was the niece of former Prime Minister Atal Bihari Vajpayee.

After having ended her 32-year-long association with BJP, on 27 February 2014, she joined Indian National Congress and contested 2014 Loksabha election from Bilaspur constituency in Chhattisgarh. She was defeated by BJP's Lakhan Lal Sahu by a margin of 176,436 votes.

She contested 2018 Chhattisgarh Vidhan sabha election from Rajnandgaon, but lost. She was defeated by former Chief minister Sri Raman Singh.

On April 27, 2021, she died from COVID-19.

References

External links
 Home Page on the Parliament of India's Website

1950 births
2021 deaths
India MPs 2004–2009
People from Gwalior
Women in Chhattisgarh politics
Lok Sabha members from Chhattisgarh
People from Janjgir-Champa district
United Progressive Alliance candidates in the 2014 Indian general election
Bharatiya Janata Party politicians from Chhattisgarh
Indian National Congress politicians
21st-century Indian women politicians
21st-century Indian politicians
Women members of the Lok Sabha
Deaths from the COVID-19 pandemic in India